The BEHEMOTH - Big Electronic Human Energized Machine, Only Too Heavy  was an electronic bike weighing in at roughly 450 pounds.  It was created by a multi-disciplinary team of volunteers led by Steve Roberts, a self-taught computer hobbyist.

History

The BEHEMOTH took three and a half years to build and it involved teams of engineers, machinists, bicycle experts, and chip-makers working in labs and shops across California including Palo Alto, Milpitas, Santa Cruz, Soquel, Scotts Valley, and Mountain View. There were many technologies that were used in this project including but not limited to fiber-glassing, sheet-metal fabrication, machining, FORTH software programming, harsh-environment packaging, networking, power management, embedded systems and audio processing.  According to Roberts, the BEHEMOTH was to be a "collection of all the geeky tools that he could imagine, integrated into a limited user interface available while pedaling a bicycle".  He envisioned a project where "computer and communication tools rendered physical location irrelevant."

Specification

The BEHEMOTH bike contained many of the latest technologies of the time which were packed within the following three main equipment enclosures:

 Console, a fiberglass-enclosed hood located on the front of the bike
 RUMP (Rear Unit of Many Purposes) located behind the bike seat
 Trailer, located at the back of the bike

The console consisted of the following technologies:

 Audio and serial switch networks allowing anything to talk to anything with simple commands
 Bicycle Control Processor which was programmed using the FORTH language
 Cordless phone, answering machine and fax machine
 Credit card verifier
 Diagnostic tools including LED matrix
 Fiberglass dome that was a satellite antenna which provided email connectivity
 Folding 6-segment aluminum console
 Handlebar keyboard on each handle
 Icom 2-meter transceiver; dedicated Larsen half-wave antenna on seat
 Immersive head-up display that was controlled by an Ampro 80286 DOS platform for CAD system
 Macintosh 68K which powered the GUI
 High Frequency (HF) datacomm
 VHF datacomm
 Radiation monitor
 Speech recognition board
 Speech synthesizer which kept the rider current with notifications from the Bicycle Control Unit
 Toshiba 1000 repackaged laptop for scrolling FAQ
 GPS satellite navigation receiver
 Ultrasonic head mouse controller
 80 MB hard disk drive

The RUMP consisted of the following technologies:

 Air compressor
 Brain-Interface Unit (Helmet)
 Headset with boom microphone
 Helmet-cooling tank and pump
 Helmet lights and cooling system
 Ear-jacks for stereo headphones
 LED taillight switch-mode controller
 Motion sensors for security
 Motorola 9600-baud modem
 Rear-view mirror on swiveled mount
 Reflection Technology Private Eye display
 Rump Control Processor (programmed using the FORTH language)
 Sealed lead-acid battery
 Sharp Color active-matrix display
 Single LED taillight cluster
 Solar panel
 Stereo System
 Sun SPARCstation
 Ultrasonic head-mouse sensors

The trailer consisted of the following technologies:

 Antenna to communicate over various amateur and public radio networks
 Audio filtration and Magic Notch
 Audio crosspoint network, bussed to console
 Automatic CW keyer
 Bike and Frame-Mounted Components
 Bike power management hardware
 Camping, video, camera, personal gear
 Canon BubbleJet printer
 CD player
 Custom recumbent bicycle
 Dual-band VHF/UHF antenna
 Fiberglass-over-cardboard composite structure
 Folding dipole antenna which enabled global coverage on the high frequency amateur radio bands
 Fluke digital multimeter
 Ham Radio station:
 High-brightness LED taillights
 Hydraulic disk brakes
 Icom 725 for HF
 Makita battery charger
 Microfiche documentation and CD library
 Mobile R&D lab
 Pneumatic controls, landing gear, pressure tank, air horn
 Qualcomm OmniTRACS satellite terminal
 Security system pager to alert police if the bike were disturbed
 Technomad Dreams
 Telebit CellBlazer high-speed modem
 Television transceiver
 Telular Celjack RJ-11 interface
 Trailer Control Processor (programmed using the FORTH language)
 Two 15 amp-hour sealed lead-acid batteries
 Under-seat steering
 72-watt Solarex photovoltaic array
 105-speed transmission

Today

The BEHEMOTH logged over 17,000 miles while in service and demonstrated the integration of technologies for recreational use as a visible artifact of early wireless mobile networking.  The BEHEMOTH was donated to the Computer History Museum, where it's currently on display.

References

Electric bicycles